Mohammad Sidique Khan (October 20, 1974 – July 7, 2005) was a Pakistani-British terrorist and the oldest of the four Islamist suicide bombers and believed to be the leader responsible for the 7 July 2005 London bombings, in which bombs were detonated on three London Underground trains and one bus in central London, suicide attacks, killing 56 people including the attackers and injuring over 700. Khan bombed the Edgware Road train killing himself and six other people.

On 1 September 2005, a videotape emerged featuring Khan. The videotape, shown by Al Jazeera Television, also shows Ayman al-Zawahiri, who was the highest leader of al-Qaeda. The two men do not appear together, and the British government says that al-Qaeda was not connected with the bombing. The Home Office believes the tape was edited after the suicide attacks and dismisses it as evidence of al-Qaeda's involvement. In the film, Khan declares, "I and thousands like me have forsaken everything for what we believe" and refers to his expectation that the media would already have painted a picture of him in accordance with government "spin". He goes on to say, "Your democratically elected governments continually perpetrate atrocities against my people all over the world. Your support makes you directly responsible. We are at war and I am a soldier. Now you too will taste the reality of this situation."

Biography 
Born in St James's University Hospital, Leeds, Khan grew up in Beeston but moved to Lees Holm in Dewsbury, near Leeds in early 2005. His father, Tika Khan, a foundry worker, was born in Pakistan. His mother is Mamida Begum. He received his secondary education at South Leeds High School, formerly the Matthew Murray High School, which was also attended by Hasib Hussain, another 7 July bus bomber. After completing his secondary education, he attended Leeds Metropolitan University as a business major. It was during his time at university that he met his wife Hasina Patel and first became interested in extremist Islam. Khan had a daughter.

In 1999, he came under the influence of radical cleric Abdullah el-Faisal.

Khan worked at Hillside Primary School in Leeds as a "learning mentor" with the children of immigrant families who had just arrived in Britain. Khan's colleagues commented that he was a quiet individual who did not talk about his religious or political beliefs. However, some acquaintances who worked for the education authority assert that he displayed open anti-British white prejudice, which was glossed over when concerns were raised.

Khan was also involved in the community-run Hamara Healthy Living Centre in Beeston, and worked at its youth outreach project, the Hamara Youth Access Point (HYAP). Staff at the centre have confirmed that two of the London bombers, Shehzad Tanweer and Hasib Hussain, frequented the HYAP. Khan used the outreach project as a recruitment centre, according to a friend of his who spoke to The Guardian.

His mother-in-law, Farida Patel, is also involved in education and works as a council liaison officer at a school in Dewsbury. In 1998, she was the first Asian woman to be invited to a Buckingham Palace garden party, meeting the Queen Elizabeth II and other members of the royal family, in recognition for her work amongst the Muslim community in Dewsbury, and again in 2004. She was said to have been "devastated" by the actions of her son-in-law.

Mohammad Sidique Khan reportedly postponed the event from 6 July 2005 because he had to take his pregnant wife to the hospital.

London bombings 

On the morning of 7 July 2005, Khan travelled by car with his three accomplices to Luton in Bedfordshire,  where the four men caught a train to London King's Cross railway station.

From there, Khan entered the London Underground and boarded a Circle Line train heading west, travelling four stops to Edgware Road. The bomb detonated at 8.50 a.m., just as the train was pulling out of Edgware Road station, killing six British victims. Personal documents of Khan's were found on the train.

Intelligence assessments
Khan is alleged to have travelled regularly to Dubai to attend military training camps, and is also believed to have spent time in Israel. In 2001, Khan was alleged to have learned bomb-making at the Malakand training camp.
He is also alleged to have trained with Indonesian terror group Jemaah Islamiyah and to be directly involved with the 2002 Bali bombing.

According to the Israeli newspaper Maariv, Khan travelled to Israel on 19 February 2003, staying only one night and leaving the next day. Maariv reports that he was suspected of having helped to plan the 30 April 2003 suicide bombing of the Mike's Place bar in Tel Aviv which killed three Israelis, carried out by two British citizens of Pakistani descent. The Israeli government allegedly played down the report.

According to Ron Suskind's The One Percent Doctrine, the NSA had been monitoring phone calls and emails between Khan and several Islamic radicals from the United States and England, including Ahmed Omar Abu Ali. Just prior to Khan's planned trip to the US, NSA intercepted email exchanges between him and some of his associates discussing a desire to "blow up synagogues on the East Coast". According to Suskind, the CIA wanted to let Khan into the US so that the FBI could put him under surveillance, but the FBI resisted on grounds that, as one FBI case agent stated, "We just can't take the risk ... he goes up and blows up a temple in Washington."  US government officials put Khan on a no-fly list to prevent him from entering the country. Suskind was critical of the decision, which the author suggested tipped him off to the fact that he was known to US authorities and might have caused him to be more cautious with his communication to avoid further surveillance.

British intelligence sources and circumstantial evidence suggested that this theory may have resulted from a confusion between two different Mohammed Khans, although it seems that Suskind stood by his claim.

According to David Leppard in The Sunday Times, Khan was assessed by MI5 in 2004, after his name appeared during an investigation into a plan to detonate a 600-lb truck bomb in London. MI5 concluded that Khan's link to the plotters was indirect, and he was not placed under surveillance. MI5 was later criticised for failing to follow up leads relating to Khan. The service responded to the criticisms. Channel 4 News published what it said were excerpts from the transcript of the tape.

US intelligence officials have said that Khan was known to Mohammed Junaid Babar, who has pleaded guilty in the US to providing material support to al-Qaeda. Babar, who told investigators that he worked on a plan to blow up pubs, railway stations, and restaurants in the UK, identified Khan as someone he had met in Pakistan.

On 18 July 2005, the Pakistani government released video footage of Khan arriving at Dubai airport on 19 November 2004 with Shehzad Tanweer, another of the London bombers. Khan and Tanweer stayed in Pakistan until 8 February 2005, then flew back to London together. A third member of the London group, 18-year-old Hasib Hussain, arrived in Karachi on 15 July 2004 from Riyadh, Saudi Arabia, on flight SV714.

See also
Shehzad Tanweer, Aldgate train
Hasib Hussain, No. 30 bus
Germaine Lindsay, Russell Square train
Dubai

References

External links
London bombers tied to Al Qaeda plot in Pakistan, by Brian Ross, ABC News, 14 July 2005
"Mentor to the young and vulnerable", by Sandra Laville and Dilpazier Aslam, The Guardian, 14 July 2005
"London bomber video aired on TV", BBC News, last updated 2 September 2005, 8:29 GMT ( with a short excerpt from the video )
Full text of the segment of the tape shown on Al-Jazeera, not necessarily the full text of the entire tape. (BBC transcription)

1974 births
2005 deaths
2005 suicides
British people of Pakistani descent
British people of Punjabi descent
English people of Pakistani descent
English people of Punjabi descent
Alumni of Leeds Beckett University
English Islamists
British Islamists
Criminals from Yorkshire
Pakistani Islamists
People from Beeston, Leeds
Perpetrators of the July 2005 London bombings
21st-century British criminals
People educated at Cockburn John Charles Academy
English mass murderers